Fantastic Personalities is a 1982 fantasy role-playing game supplement published by Judges Guild.

Contents
Fantastic Personalities described 85 non-player characters at length, including level, social level, armor, alignment, class, and 14 ability numbers, to be selected from in accordance with the user's fantasy role-playing game.

Reception
Lewis Pulsipher reviewed Fantastic Personalities in The Space Gamer No. 52. Pulsipher commented that "While the characters themselves are good (if you can't or won't devise NPCs yourself), the layout and editorial conception of the booklet is poor. You should get more than this for [the price]."

References

Judges Guild fantasy role-playing game supplements
Role-playing game supplements introduced in 1982